Maple Valley is an unincorporated community in Henry County, Indiana, in the United States.

History
Maple Valley was originally called Elizabeth City, and under the latter was laid out and platted in 1838. When a post office was established in 1878, it was discovered that there was another post office called Elizabeth City in Indiana, and so the name Maple Valley was selected in order to avoid repetition. The Maple Valley post office was discontinued in 1903.

References

Unincorporated communities in Henry County, Indiana
Unincorporated communities in Indiana